Coinbase Global, Inc., branded Coinbase, is an American publicly traded company that operates a cryptocurrency exchange platform. Coinbase is a distributed company; all employees operate via remote work and the company lacks a physical headquarters. It is the largest cryptocurrency exchange in the United States by trading volume. The company was founded in 2012 by Brian Armstrong and Fred Ehrsam. In May 2020, Coinbase announced it would shut its San Francisco, California headquarters and change operations to remote-first, part of a wave of several major tech companies closing headquarters in San Francisco in the wake of the COVID-19 pandemic.

History

2012–2019: founding and early years 

Coinbase was founded in June 2012 by Brian Armstrong, a former Airbnb engineer. Armstrong enrolled in the Y Combinator startup incubator program and received a cash infusion. Fred Ehrsam, a former Goldman Sachs trader, later joined as a co-founder after noticing Armstrong's posts on Reddit. British programmer and Blockchain.info co-founder Ben Reeves was originally supposed to be part of the Coinbase founding team but parted ways with Armstrong just before the YCombinator funding event, due to their different stands on how the Coinbase wallet should operate. The company is named after coinbase transactions, which are special transactions that introduce cryptocurrency into circulation in proof of work cryptocurrencies. In October 2012, the company launched the services to buy and sell bitcoins through bank transfers.

In May 2013, the company received a million Series A investment led by Fred Wilson from the venture capital firm Union Square Ventures. In December the same year, the company received a million investment, from the venture capital firms Andreessen Horowitz, Union Square Ventures (USV), and Ribbit Capital. Olaf Carlson-Wee, a graduate from Vassar College, was hired as the first employee in the same year.

In 2014, the company grew to one million users, acquired the blockchain explorer service Blockr and the web bookmarking company Kippt, secured insurance covering the value of bitcoin stored on their servers and launched the vault system for secure bitcoin storage. Throughout 2014, the company also partnered with Overstock, Dell, Expedia, Dish Network, and Time Inc. allowing those firms to accept bitcoin payments. In the same year, company also added bitcoin payment processing capabilities to the traditional payment companies Stripe, Braintree, and PayPal. In January 2014, Coinbase Global, Inc. was incorporated in Delaware as a holding company for Coinbase and its subsidiaries. The corporate reorganization that saw Coinbase become a subsidiary of Coinbase Global was completed in April of that year.

In January 2015, the company received a million investment, led by Draper Fisher Jurvetson, the New York Stock Exchange, USAA, and several banks. Later in January, the company launched a U.S.-based bitcoin exchange for professional traders called Coinbase Exchange. In September, Coinbase began to offer services in Canada and Singapore.

In May 2016, the company rebranded the Coinbase Exchange, changing the name to Global Digital Asset Exchange (GDAX). In July, they added retail support for Ether. Also in July, they announced they would halt services in August after the closure of Canadian online payments service provider Vogogo.

In January and then March 2017, Coinbase obtained the BitLicense and licensed to trade in Ethereum and Litecoin from the New York State Department of Financial Services (DFS). In November, Coinbase was ordered by the U.S. Internal Revenue Service to report any users who had at least  in transactions in a year. On December 19, Coinbase listed Bitcoin Cash, and the Coinbase platform experienced price abnormalities that led to an insider trading investigation.

On February 23, 2018, Coinbase told approximately 13,000 affected customers that the company would be providing their taxpayer ID, name, birth date, address, and historical transaction records from 2013 to 2015 to the IRS within 21days. In March, Coinbase appointed Emilie Choi, a former LinkedIn executive, as Vice President of Corporate and Business Development. She was promoted to the role of president and chief operating officer in May 2019. On March 26, 2018, Coinbase announced their intention to add support for ERC-20 tokens. On April 5, 2018, Coinbase announced that it had formed an early-stage venture fund, Coinbase Ventures, focusing on investment into blockchain- and cryptocurrency-related companies. On May 16, Coinbase Ventures announced its first investment in Compound Labs, a start-up building Ethereum smart contracts similar to money markets. On May 23, GDAX was rebranded as Coinbase Pro. Also in May, Coinbase launched Prime, a platform dedicated to institutional customers. In August, Amazon cloud executive Tim Wagner joined Coinbase as vice president of engineering. In September, Coinbase, along with Circle and Bitcoin miner company Bitmain, was part of a consortium called Centre that launched a digital coin called USD Coin, pegged to the U.S. dollar.

In January 2019, Coinbase stopped all trading on Ethereum Classic due to a suspicion of an attack on the network. In February, Coinbase announced that it had acquired "blockchain intelligence platform" Neutrino, an Italy-based startup, for an undisclosed price. The acquisition raised concern among some Coinbase users based on Neutrino founders' connection to the Hacking Team, which has been accused of providing internet surveillance technology to governments with poor human rights records. On March 4, Coinbase CEO Brian Armstrong said his company "did not properly evaluate" the deal from a due diligence perspective and thus any Neutrino staff who previously worked at Hacking Team "will transition out of Coinbase." In April, a U.K. corporate filing stated that Coinbase's non-U.S. revenue grew 20percent to €153million (million) in 2018 resulting in a net profit of €6.6million. Coinbase U.K. CEO Zeeshan Feroz said the company's non-U.S. operations accounted for nearly one-third of the company's overall revenue and Reuters estimated that the company's global revenue totaled "around $520million" in 2018. In August, Coinbase announced that it was targeted by a sophisticated hacking attack attempt in mid-June. This reported attack used spear-phishing and social engineering tactics (including sending fake e-mails from compromised email accounts and creating a landing page at the University of Cambridge) and two Firefox browser zero-day vulnerabilities. One of the Firefox vulnerabilities could allow an attacker to escalate privileges from JavaScript on a browser page and the second one could allow the attacker to escape the browser sandbox and execute code on the host computer. Coinbase's security team detected and blocked the attack, the network was not compromised, and no cryptocurrency was stolen.

2020–2021: remote-first model and IPO 

In May 2020, during the COVID-19 pandemic, the company announced it was shifting completely to remote work and would no longer recognize a formal headquarters. In June, Coinbase received internal backlash after CEO Brian Armstrong initially refused to make a statement about Black Lives Matter, citing the company's apolitical culture, but Armstrong later reversed his course on Twitter. In September, Armstrong published a blog post emphasizing that Coinbase would not engage in social activism, citing that such activism had hurt other technology firms such as Google and Facebook, and offered a severance package for those who disagreed with this direction. The company also faced complaints by employees saying they were treated unfairly due to their race or gender. In October, Coinbase announced the launch of a Visa debit card program. In December, The New York Times reported that based upon data up to 2018 (already two years old as of the date of publication) women at Coinbase were paid an average of eight percent less than men at comparable jobs and ranks within the company, and Black employees were paid seven percent less than those in similar roles.

In March 2021, the company fell under review by the Office of Foreign Assets Control, with concerns that the company may have provided their blockchain service to blacklisted individuals or companies, noting that the nature of blockchain technology makes it "technically infeasible" to prevent specific users from making transactions.

In March 2021, the company agreed to pay million to settle regulatory claims that it had reported misleading information about its trading volumes. Also in March, Coinbase announced that it was establishing a business presence in India and hiring employees for IT services, including engineering, software development and customer support operations. The company also announced plans to open a physical office in Hyderabad.

In April 2021, with its final earnings release before its April 14 direct listing, the company reported a nine-fold increase in first-quarter revenue, to billion, up from million the previous year. The jump was attributed to the increase in the price of Bitcoin over that period.

On April 14, 2021, Coinbase became a public company on the Nasdaq exchange via a direct stock listing. Before the listing, Nasdaq set a reference price of  a share, giving the company an estimated value of billion. In May, the company's chief people officer published a blog post announcing that Coinbase was eliminating salary and equity negotiations during recruiting, citing salary disparities with women and minorities. The announcement said that "all employees in the same position, in the same location, receive the same salary and equity offer." In June, Coinbase added Dogecoin to its tradable assets for Coinbase Pro users. In September, the U.S. Securities and Exchange Commission reportedly threatened to sue Coinbase if the company decided to launch a cryptocurrency lending product called Lend. The company initially responded in a blog post that it was confused for being singled out by the SEC, but later announced it had canceled the planned launch. Technology publication TechCrunch covered the story and noted the existence of similar cryptocurrency lending products already on the market. In November, Coinbase made its first acquisition in India by purchasing AI-powered support platform Agara for an estimated US$4050million. The company stated that it would utilize Agara's technology to automate its customer experience tools.
On December 15 a display glitch vastly inflated balances such that numerous users were, albeit briefly, trillionaires.

2022–present

Super Bowl advertisement 

Coinbase's 60-second commercial during Super Bowl LVI achieved viral status and was considered to be the most effective of any commercial during the game. The code directed users to a web page advertising  in free Bitcoin for new accounts plus entry into a promotion for a sweepstakes to win three million prizes for Bitcoin. The low-tech image evoked the retro look of the old DVD screensaver logo bouncing around the screen.

The advertisement had no narration and only music. The influx of users caused Coinbase's website to crash. Coinbase's landing page received 20million hits in one minute. Its iOS app jumped from No.186 to No.2 in overall downloads after the advertisement. The ad was parodied later in the night by Meta (which posted its own, similar ad on social media to advertise a streaming Foo Fighters concert after the game). Meta quipped "Hopefully this doesn't break." The Super Bowl which has been nicknamed the "Crypto Bowl" also featured commercials by Crypto.com, eToro, and FTX on the American telecast.

The Martin Agency CEO Kristen Cavallo, criticized Coinbase CEO Brian Armstrong for not acknowledging the role that agencies had played in the creation of the ad.

Russian invasion of Ukraine, failure of India expansion, layoffs, and partnerships 

In response to the 2022 Russian invasion of Ukraine, Coinbase blocked 25,000 cryptocurrency wallet addresses related to Russia, believing them to have engaged in illicit activity.

Coinbase began operations in India in April 2022. The company initially relied on Unified Payments Interface to allow users to convert rupees to cryptocurrencies, but ceased using UPI after a statement released by the National Payments Corporation of India indicating it was "not aware of any crypto exchange using UPI". This statement forced Coinbase to suspend most of its business in India. Users in India cannot convert rupees into cryptocurrency but can trade between different cryptocurrencies.

On June 14, 2022, the company announced it would be laying off approximately 18percent of its workforce, about 1,100 full-time jobs, amid the global downturn in cryptocurrencies and services.

In August 2022, Coinbase announced a partnership with BlackRock, a venture which allows BlackRock clients to use their Aladdin investment management system to oversee their exposure to Bitcoin along with other portfolio assets, and to facilitate trading on Coinbase's exchange.

Coinbase reported a net loss of billion in the second quarter of 2022, a record for the company. In October 2022, Coinbase entered into a partnership with Google Cloud Platform that would allow the latter's customers to pay for cloud services with cryptocurrencies supported by Coinbase Commerce. Coinbase also agreed to transfer its data-related applications from Amazon Web Services to Google Cloud.

Coinbase exposure to FTX's bankruptcy is million.

On January 10, 2023, Coinbase announced it would be laying off around 950employees, incurring restructuring expenses of up to million. Citing the possibility of "further contagion" following the collapse of the FTX exchange, Brian Armstrong said Coinbase would be "shutting down several projects where we have a lower probability of success."

Products 

Coinbase offers products for both retail and institutional cryptocurrency investors, as well as other related cryptocurrency products.

The company's products for retail traders include:
 Coinbase, an app used to buy, store and trade different cryptocurrencies, such as Bitcoin, Bitcoin Cash, Ethereum, Ethereum Classic and Litecoin
 Coinbase Pro, a professional asset trading platform for trading digital assets
 Coinbase Wallet, an app that allows customers to access decentralized crypto apps (dapps) using a dapp browser
 Coinbase NFT, a marketplace where NFT collectors can buy and sell their pieces to one another

Products for institutional traders include:
 Coinbase Prime, a trading platform for institutional customers
 Coinbase Custody, specialist level services for institutions that hold bitcoin and other cryptocurrencies with Coinbase

Other cryptocurrency-related products include:
 USD Coin, a digital stablecoin that lets customers put up U.S. dollars in exchange for a cryptocurrency that has the same value but can be traded more quickly
 Coinbase Card, a debit Visa card that allows customers to spend cryptocurrency
 Coinbase Commerce, a payment service for merchants
 Coinbase Earn, a cryptocurrency learning platform that rewards users with small amounts of altcoins for watching videos and taking quizzes to learn about them

The company develops an application programming interface (API) for developers and merchants to build applications and accept payments in digital currencies.

Coinbase has a mobile app for both iOS and Android.

Operations 

Coinbase operates as a remote-first company and has no physical headquarters. As part of its SEC filing to go public, the company reported 43million verified users, 7,000 institutions, and 115,000 ecosystem partners in over 100countries. It also reported net revenue of billion in 2020, up from million the previous year. The company also reported a net income of million after posting a loss in 2019.  Out of the billion worth of assets on the crypto market, some billion worth is held on the Coinbase platform.

, the company offered to buy/sell trading functionality in 32countries, while the cryptocurrency wallet was available in 190countries worldwide.

Custody of client assets 

In a May 2022 Form 10-Q filing, Coinbase stated that "because custodially held crypto assets may be considered to be the property of a bankruptcy estate, in the event of a bankruptcy, the crypto assets we hold in custody on behalf of our customers could be subject to bankruptcy proceedings and such customers could be treated as our general unsecured creditors".

Coinbase effect 

The "Coinbase Effect" refers to the rise in price of cryptocurrencies listed for sale on a dominant crypto exchange such as Coinbase in the days after the news becomes public. According to a report in the Barron's newspaper, the effect of getting a cryptocurrency listed on the exchange plays a big role in what cryptocurrencies gain widespread acceptance.

Complaints 

On February 16, 2018, Coinbase admitted that some customers were overcharged in error for credit and debit purchases of cryptocurrencies. The problem was initiated when banks and card issuers changed the merchant category code (MCC) for cryptocurrency purchases earlier that month. This meant that cryptocurrency payments would now be processed as "cash advances", meaning that banks and credit card issuers could begin charging customers cash advance fees for cryptocurrency purchases. Customers who purchased cryptocurrency on their exchange between January 22 and February 11, 2018, could have been affected. At first, Visa blamed Coinbase, telling the Financial Times on February 16 that it had "not made any systems changes that would result in the duplicate transactions cardholders are reporting." However, the latest statement from Visa and Worldpay on the Coinbase blog clarifies: "This issue was not caused by Coinbase."

In March 2018, the Quartz news website reported that the number of monthly customer complaints against Coinbase jumped more than 100 percent in January of that year, to 889, citing official Consumer Financial Protection Bureau data, with more than 400 of those categorized as "money was not available when promised". The article also noted that the company was subsequently increasing its customer service staff to reduce wait times.

In December 2021, CNBC reported that Coinbase froze the cryptocurrency GYEN due to a sudden price spike, resulting in many traders losing money.

Insider trading 

On July 22, 2022, a former Coinbase product manager, Ishan Wahi, along with Nikhil Wahi (Ishan's brother) and Sameer Ramani (a friend), was charged in the first-ever insider trading case in cryptocurrency by prosecutors for the Southern District of New York and the Securities and Exchange Commission.  According to the complaint filed in SEC v. Wahi, Ishan Wahi allegedly shared information that certain tokens were about to be listed by Coinbase with Nikhil Wahi and Ramani, who then allegedly acted upon that information to make trades for an alleged illicit profit over million.  According to federal prosecutors, Ishan Wahi purchased a one-way ticket to India upon being summoned by Coinbase to the company's Seattle office for a meeting. Wahi was subsequently intercepted by law enforcement from boarding a May 16 flight to India. Coinbase's chief security officer, Philip Martin, noted that the company provided prosecutors with information from an internal investigation.

On January 10, 2023, Nikhil Wahi was sentenced to ten months in prison after he admitted to making trades based on confidential information from Coinbase. U.S. District Judge Loretta Preska said Wahi's crime was "not an isolated error in judgment." Ishan Wahi originally pleaded not guilty but entered a guilty plea on February 7, 2023. He will be sentenced on May 10. Ramani remains at large.

See also 

 List of bitcoin companies

References

External links 

 

Bitcoin exchanges
Y Combinator companies
American companies established in 2012
Bitcoin companies
Digital currency exchanges
Companies listed on the Nasdaq
Direct stock offerings